Pratt Field may refer to
 Pratt Field (Massachusetts), college football field at Amherst College, the third-oldest college football field in the United States
 Pratt Field (Texas), baseball stadium in Mineral Wells, Texas